International Conference on Information Systems (ICIS) is an annual international conference for academics and research-oriented practitioners in the area of information systems. Previously known as the Conference on Information Systems (CIS), ICIS is the flagship conference of the Association for Information Systems, an international professional organization serving academics in information systems.

ICIS was founded in 1980 at the University of California, Los Angeles, and the first conference was held in Philadelphia the same year. Starting in 1990, when it had its first international venue in Copenhagen, ICIS has been traditionally held outside of North America regularly. ICIS currently rotates between the Americas (AIS Region 1), Europe/Middle East/Africa (AIS Region 2), and Asia/Australia (AIS Region 3). ICIS is usually scheduled in early December and lasts for four days.

The conference is preceded by the ICIS Doctoral Consortium, held off site, usually in a nearby resort. The consortium brings together senior faculty from Information Systems (many of whom were participants in past consortia) and ~40 doctoral students, selected from ~120 nominations (each university or institution is allowed to nominate only one participant).

Past and Future Conferences

References

External links 
 

Information systems conferences
Academic conferences
Association for Information Systems conferences